Jean D. Hewitt (1925–1997) was an English-American food writer and home economist known for her advocacy of natural foods.

Biography

Hewitt was born in Ipswich. She studied at the Westminster School for Chefs in London and moved to New York during World War II. She obtained a bachelor's degree in food and nutrition from the University of London and M.Sc from Teachers College, Columbia University. Hewitt joined The New York Times as a food writer and worked as assistant to Craig Claiborne in 1961.

She managed The Times's test kitchen and in 1975 was named food editor of the Family Circle magazine. Hewitt died from pneumonia at Secours-Venice Hospital in Venice, Florida.

Cookbooks

Hewitt wrote a number of popular cookbooks, four of which received the James Beard Food and Beverage Book Award. She was an early advocate of natural foods.

Hewitt was the author of the bestseller New York Times Natural Foods Cookbook, first published in 1971, which gave recipes of natural unprocessed foods. The recipes were dedicated to "the thousands of people across the country who believe in and practice, the natural way of eating for good health."

Hewitt spent five years travelling America and compiled recipes from the cookery of the fifty states for her Heritage Cook Book, first published in 1972. Her book, Family Circle Quick Menu Cookbook offers quick full meals that can be prepared in less than an hour.

Hewitt's International Meatless Cookbook (1980) is a semi-vegetarian cookbook which eschews the consumption of red meat. It contains vegetarian recipes with sections of chicken and fish dishes.

Quotes

Selected publications

See also

Beatrice Trum Hunter

References

1925 births
1997 deaths
Alumni of the University of London
American cookbook writers
American nutritionists
Deaths from pneumonia in Florida
Diet food advocates
British emigrants to the United States
English food writers
Home economists
Writers from Ipswich
Teachers College, Columbia University alumni
The New York Times writers